Henk Boeve (born 28 August 1957) is a Dutch former professional racing cyclist. He rode in the 1986 Tour de France.

References

External links

1957 births
Living people
Dutch male cyclists
People from Hellendoorn
Cyclists from Overijssel
20th-century Dutch people